The MeMZ 965 was a Soviet automobile engine, built by the Melitopolski Motor Plant (MeMZ).

Originally known as the NAMI-G (for the Soviet National Automotive Institute), the MeMZ 965 was designed for use in the LuAZ-967. It was a  air-cooled 90° V4, producing . It had had characteristics not common for automobile engines, including a magnesium alloy engine block, accessories mounted high (to assist in case of crossing rivers), and a rear-mounted oil cooler.

When the initial MD-65 engine proposed for the ZAZ-965 proved inadequate, the MeMZ engine was selected, thanks in part to it being air-cooled, like the successful VW Type 1's boxer engine.

It would be developed into the  MeMZ 966 and the  MeMZ 968. The MeMZ 968 was offered in the ZAZ 968M in three performance levels: E (carbureted, low-compression for 76-octane fuel); GE (dual carburettor); or BE (8.4:1 compression, for 93-octane).

In addition, the 965 would serve as a prototype   vee-twin (half an MeMZ 965), for the prototype NAMI 086.

Applications:
 LuAZ-967
 ZAZ-969
 ZAZ-965
 ZAZ-965A
 ZAZ-966
 ZAZ-968
 ZAZ-968M

Notes

Sources 
 Thompson, Andy. Cars of the Soviet Union. Somerset, UK: Haynes Publishing, 2008.
 ZAZ-965/965A, Avtolegendy SSSR Nr.17, DeAgostini 2009. ISSN 2071-095X. 

Science and technology in the Soviet Union
Automobile engines
V4 engines